Christopher "Chris" Forgues, (also known professionally as C.F. and Kites), is an artist and musician, best known for his graphic novel serial Powr Mastrs. He is based in Providence, Rhode Island.

About 
He holds a B.F.A. from the Massachusetts College of Art and Design. C.F. was influenced in the 2000s by the Fort Thunder art collective in Providence, Rhode Island and did some worked with them. C.F. collaborated with Ben Jones on a zine project called "Paper Radio". Art in America magazine named Forgues one of the, "most important cartoonists of their generation" for his work with Paper Radio.

His graphic novel series, Powr Mastrs, is published by Picturebox. His story "Mosfet Warlock and the Mechlin Men" was included in The Best American Comics 2009, edited by Charles Burns. His work has also been published in Kramers Ergot, and has been shown at galleries in New York and Los Angeles. Forgues had a monthly comic strip, Monorail High, in Mothers News, a monthly newspaper published in Providence, Rhode Island.

His comics and graphic novels make heavy use of surrealism and absurdity, while often paying homage to older comic genres such as pulp. He has been praised by The Comics Reporter for his skills at "overlooked nuances of comics storytelling, in particular pacing".

As a musician, Forgues has toured the United States several times, also appearing in Europe and Canada. Forgues employs homemade electronics, effects pedals, and altered acoustic instruments.

Selected work

Music 
 Kites: Royal Paint With The Metallic Gardener From The United States Of America Helped Into An Open Field By Women And Children (2004)
 Kites: Peace Trials (Load Records, 2006)
 Kites: Hallucination Guillotine/Final Worship (Load Records, 2008)
 Daily Life: Necessary and Pathetic (Load Records, 2010)

Books 
 
 
 
 Powr Mastrs Vol. 3 (PictureBox, 2010)
 Sediment (PictureBox, 2011)
 Mere (PictureBox, 2013)

References

External links
PictureBox, "Beginnings"
 Interview, Proust Questionnaire, PowerPoint

American graphic novelists
1979 births
Living people
Artists from Rhode Island
American male novelists
Massachusetts College of Art and Design alumni
Load Records artists